Michael Bailey (1979-present) is an American writer and editor who primarily works with horror and science fiction. His work occasionally blends into other genres such as mystery, western, and thriller, usually with a speculative angle. Most of his fiction and poetry can be categorized as psychological or literary horror. He has authored numerous novels, novellas, novelettes, and fiction & poetry collections. 

Some of his writing mentors include Douglas E. Winter, F. Paul Wilson, Gary A. Braunbeck, and the late Jack Ketchum. He pays it forward by mentoring and coaching up-and-coming writers from around the world, and serves as a Senior Editor for an undisclosed publisher where he manages a team of developmental editors.

Along with being the screenwriter for Madness and Writers: The Untold Truth. Maybe?, he runs the small press Written Backwards and publishes anthologies and other unique books, most of which include poetry and illustrations. He also designs covers and provides interior layout for various authors.

Personal Life 

Bailey lives in Costa Rica where he is rebuilding his life after surviving one of the most catastrophic wildfires in California history, which is explored in his memoir Seven Minutes. When he is not working on his own projects, he spends his time mentoring and teaching writers how to improve their craft.

Associations 

Horror Writers Association – Active Member
Science Fiction and Fantasy Writers Association – Active Member

Bibliography

Novels 

 Palindrome Hannah (2005), illustrated by Michael Ian Bateson 
 Phoenix Rose (2009)
 Psychotropic Dragon (2021), illustrated by Daniele Serra, Glenn Chadbourne, L.A. Spooner, and Ty Scheuerman

Novellas 
 Agatha's Barn (2020), tie-in to Carpenter's Farm by Josh Malerman
 A Rose / Arose (2021)
 The Call of the Void (2022), with Erinn L. Kemper

Novelettes 

 The Trial Chair (2010)
 Dandelion Clocks (2014)
 SAD Face (2018)
 Darkroom (2018)
 Our Children, Our Teachers (2018)
 Articles of Teleforce (2018), Fantastic Tales of Terror
 Somnambulism / I Summon Lambs (2021)

Collections 

 Scales and Petals (2010), with a graphic adaptation by L.A. Spooner 
 Inkblots and Blood Spots (2014), illustrated by Daniele Serra 
 Enso: A Connection of Fables (2016), illustrated by L.A. Spooner 
 Oversight (2018)
 The Impossible Weight of Life (2020)
 Sifting the Ashes (2022), with Marge Simon

Anthologies 

 Pellucid Lunacy (2010)
 Chiral Mad (2012), introduction by Thomas F. Monteleone 
 Chiral Mad 2 (2013)
 The Library of the Dead (2015), illustrated by Gak
 Chiral Mad 3 (2016), introduction by Chuck Palahniuk
 You, Human: An Anthology of Dark Science Fiction, (2016), introduction by F. Paul Wilson, illustrated by Orion Zangara and L.A. Spooner
 Adam's Ladder (2017), co-edited with Darren Speegle 
 Stokercon Anthology (2018), featuring Victor LaValle, Ramsey Campbell, Elizabeth Massie, Craig Engler, Caitlín R. Kiernan, and Sam Weller
 Chiral Mad 4: An Anthology of Collaborations (2018), co-edited with Lucy A. Snyder, introduction by Gary A. Braunbeck & Janet Harriett
 Miscreations: Gods, Monstrosities & Other Horrors (2020), co-edited with Doug Murano, introduction by Alma Katsu, illustrated by HagCult
 Prisms (2021), co-edited with Darren Speegle
 Chiral Mad 5 (2022), illustrated by Seth Brown

Nonfiction 

 Righting Writing (2023)

Awards

Publications

Short Fiction 

 "Unstitched Love" (2006), Something Weird, Australia; 2012, Something Wicked Anthology, Vol. 1, South Africa
 "Defenestrate" (2007), In Bad Dreams - Vol. 1: Where Real Life Awaits, Sweden
 "Without Face" (2008), Something Wicked, Issue 6, South Africa
 "The Dying Gaul" (2010), The Phantom Queen Awakes, Sweden
 "Golden Rule" (2010)
 "Wilted Flowers" (2010)
 "The Girl in the Red Flower Pattern Dress" (2010)
 "Empty Canvas" (2010)
 "Portrayal" (2010)
 "Yellow" (2010)
 "Small Print / Pylon" (2010)
 "I Wanted Black" (2010), Pellucid Lunacy
 "Plasty" (2010)
 "Habit" (2010)
 "The Shower Curtain Man" (2010)
 "Fix" (2010)
 "It Tears Away" (2011), The Shadow of the Unknown
 "A Light in the Closet" (2011), Beyond Centauri
 "Coulrophobic" (2012), Here There Be Clowns
 "The Mascot" (2012), Unnatural Tales of the Jackalope
 "Bootstrap / The Binds of Lasolastica" (2012), Zippered Flesh
 "Hiatus" (2012), Surviving the End
 "Not the Child" (2012), Chiral Mad, writing as Julie Stipes
 "Scrub" (2012), Uncommon Assassins
 "Mum" (2013), Canopic Jars
 "Skinny" (2013), Anthology: Year Two, writing as Julie Stipes
 "Fireman / Primal Tongue (2013), Zippered Flesh 2
 "Brick House" (2014), Blight Digest
 "Time Is a Face on the Water" (2016), Borderlands 6
 "I Will Be the Reflection Until the End" (2017), Tales from the Lake, Vol. 4
 "The Other Side of Semicolons" (2018), Monsters of Any Kind
 "Essential Oils" (2018), 18 Wheels of Science Fiction
 "The Long White Line" (2018), Lost Highways
 "Fade to Black / White to Black" (2019), The Horror Book of Phobias
 "Speaking Cursive" (2018), Birthing Monsters: Frankenstein's Cabinet of Curiosities
 "Underwater Ferris Wheel" (2019), Best New Horror #29
 "Eavesdropping" (2020)
 "Möbius" (2020), The Pulp Horror Book of Phobias, Vol. 2
 "Ghosts of Calistoga" (2020), Reflections
 "Gave" (2020), After Sundown
 "Hourglass" (2020)
 "Fragments of Br_an" (2020)
 "Emergence of the Colorless" (2020)
 "Oll Korrect" (2020)
 "Boketto / A Murmuration of Souls" (2020), Borderlands 7
 "Slo-Mo" (2022), Hybrid: Misfits, Monsters and Other Phenomena
 "I Have Seen the Elephant" (2022), Blood in the Soil, Terror on the Wind
 "Labyrinthine" (2023), Never Wakes
 "The Speed of Healing" (2023), Bestiary of Blood

Graphic Adaptations 
 "Plasty" (2018), illustrated by L.A. Spooner

Poetry 

 "The End of Time / The Seed, Part 1)" (2004), ART: Mag 27
 "Feast of Crows" (2004), The Harrow
 "The Box" (2005), The Harrow
 "Paper Sister" (2005), Palindrome Hannah
 "Strangers" (2005), Palindrome Hannah
 "The Most Beautiful Place" (2005), Palindrome Hannah
 "The End of Time" (2010)
 "Lost" (2010)
 "Mon Autumn" (2010)
 "Moth" (2010)
 "The Hand" (2010)
 "War" (2010)
 "Black" (2010)
 "The Betrayer" (2010)
 "The Start of Forever / The Seed, Part 2" (2010)
 "Sticks and Bones" (2011), Askew
 "Open Aura" (2012), Poe-It
 "All but the Things That Cannot Be Torn" (2013), Tales of Blood and Roses
 "Whisper Dance" (2013), Angels Cried
 "Ink" (2014), Jamais Vu: Journal of Strange Among the Familiar, Vol. 2
 "Beneath Clouds" (2014)
 "Alive" (2014)
 "The Two of You" (2014)
 "Bogey" (2014)
 "Void" (2014)
 "Simon the Parasite" (2014)
 "Listen to Me" (2014)
 "Twisted" (2014)
 "Secret Smile" (2014)
 "Though It Rains" (2014)
 "Countdown to Null" (2014)
 "Not Responding" (2014)
 "Shades of Red" (2019), Poetry Showcase, Vol. 6
 "Loosed Earth" (2020)
 "Hurt People Hurt People" (2020)
 "Life (c)remains" (2020)
 "Lest We End" (2020)
 "Past the Past" (2020)
 "Blink" (2020)
 "Sands of Time" (2020)
 "Who Will Teach Them?" (2020)
 "The Nocturnal Waking Nightmare" (2020)
 "Paper Earth" (2020)
 "Apanthropy" (2020)
 "Night Rainbows" (2020)
 "Angel Wings of Death" (2022)
 "Orange Borealis" (2022)
 "Diggin' Ghosts" (2022)
 "Arcing" (2022)
 "Sleep, Child" (2022)
 "The Great Build-up" (2022)
 "First to Respond" (2022)
 "A Warning" (2022)
 "Freebird" (2022)
 "Weapons of Mass Distraction" (2022)
 "Kilned" (2022)
 "Blocked" (2022)
 "The Devil's Matchsticks" (2022)
 "23 Days" (2022)
 "Arachnid" (2022), The Call of the Void
 "Sleep, What Might It Bring (2022)
 "Birthday Deathbed" (2022)
 "Wings Outstretched" (2022)
 "Night-swimming" (2022)
 "Conflagration" (2022)
 "Crawling Mountains" (2022)
 "Weather, Simplified" (2022)
 "The Longest Drive" (2022)
 "Spread Thin" (2022)
 "What Day Is This?" (2022)
 "Moonscape" (2022)
 "The Aftermath" (2022)
 "Inspectors" (2022)
 "Phoenixes" (2022)
 "Price of Freedom" (2022)
 "Disposable Hazmat" (2022)
 "The Word" (2022)
 "Twins Unborn on 9/11" (2022)
 "Cartwheels" (2022)
 "Coverage" (2022)
 "Masked" (2022)
 "Take My Forest" (2022)
 "Wor(l)ds Dissolve" (2022)
 "Forever-Hungry Drums" (2022)
 "Startled Awake" (2022)
 "Let Me Go, Please" (2022)
 "Who Are You?" (2022)
 "One Vacant Lot" (2022)
 "Forecast" (2022)
 "A Recursive Cleanse" (2022)
 "Dispatch" (2022)
 "Trapped" (2022)
 "One of a Thousand Calls" (2022)
 "It's Probably Nothing" (2022)
 "Dear Deer" (2022)
 "Survivalism" (2022)
 "The Firegod Cometh" (2022), with Marge Simon
 "Pacific Gassed & Electrified" (2022), with Marge Simon
 "Clogged Ateries" (2022), with Marge Simon
 "Journey's End" (2022), with Marge Simon
 "In Media Res" (2022), with Marge Simon
 "There Until Remembered" (2022), with Marge Simon
 "A Return to Normalcy" (2022), with Marge Simon

Nonfiction / Essays 

 "Intro / Outro" (2013), Chiral Mad 2
 "0-1" (2014), introduction to Qualia Nous 
 "Why Charlaine Harris Matters" (2015), World Horror Convention Souvenir Book
 "Great Horror Is Something Alien" (2017), Where Nightmares Come From: The Art of Storytelling in the Horror Genre
 "Ah-ha: Beginning to End" (2018),  with Chuck Palahniuk, It's Alive: Bringing Your Nightmares to Life
 "Burn After Reading" (2022), What Remains

Book Design 

 At the Lazy K (2015), by Gene O'Neill, introduction by Rena Mason, illustrated by L.A. Spooner
 Other Music (2016), by Marc Levinthal, introduction by John Skipp
 The Confessions of St. Zach (2016), by Gene O'Neill, introduction by John R. Little, illustrated by Orion Zangara
 The Burden of Indigo (2016), by Gene O'Neill, introduction by Lisa Morton, illustrated by Orion Zangara
 The Near Future (2017), by Gene O'Neill, introduction by Megan Arcuri, illustrated by Orion Zangara
 The Far Future (2017), by Gene O'Neill, introduction by Scott Edelman, illustrated by Orion Zangara
 Yes Trespassing (2017), by Erik T. Johnson
 Liars, Fakers, and the Dead Who Eat Them (2017), by Scott Edelman, introduction by Gene O'Neill, illustrated by Daniele Serra
 Artifacts (2018), by Darren Speegle, introduction by Gene O'Neill, illustrated  by L.A. Spooner
 Off Season 35th Anniversary Edition by Jack Ketchum (2018), illustrated by Tomislav Tikulin
 Bird Box Special Edition (2019) by Josh Malerman, illustrated by Glenn Chadbourne

Note: All Written Backwards books are also designed by Michael Bailey, including original artwork.

References

External Links 
 Written Backwards
 Madness & Writers: The Untold Truth. Maybe?

21st-century American writers
American horror writers
Living people